Mia Young (born January 9, 1970), better known by her stage name Mia X, is an American rapper and songwriter from New Orleans. She enjoyed success in the local "bounce" scene of the early 1990s. She was the first female emcee to get a contract with rapper and entertainment magnate, Master P on his successful record label No Limit Records. She is known for collaborations with several No Limit Records artists, including Master P and Silkk the Shocker on the seminal albums, Ice Cream Man,  Ghetto D and Charge It 2 Da Game.

Personal life
Young grew up in the Lafitte housing project in New Orleans' seventh ward. Her father was a trucker and her mother was a counselor. She graduated from Redeemer High School and briefly attended Delgado Community College before she decided to pursue a career in music.

In 2006 in a magazine article, her publicist releases a statement of an upcoming cookbook. Before her cookbook she did on online page on instagram #teamwhipdempots. Her cookbook was finally released in 2018.

In the 2010s, Mia X was diagnosed with uterine cancer and beat it. In surgery for the cancer, the surgeons accidentally "tore her cornea off", and that left her with 73% vision in one eye.

Music career

Music beginnings
Mia X's rap career began in the late '80s and early '90s before she graduated from high school, when she performed in a "mobile entertainment service" called New York Inc. with Mannie Fresh, who would later rise to stardom as the production genius behind Cash Money Records. She made her recorded debut in 1992 with the single "Ask them Suckas" (an answer song created in response to "Ask them Hoes" by 39 Posse), on Lamina Records. In 1993, she released "Da Payback," a maxi-single which appeared on both the Rap Dis! and Lamina Records labels, which despite its status as "the No. 1-selling local record of 1993 at Odyssey Records" did not generate any income for the artist.  

In 1994, Mia X signed a contract for two albums with Roy Joseph, Jr.'s Emoja Records. The label (along with its successor, Slaughterhouse Records) released her full-length debut Mommie Dearest in 1995. Joseph later filed a $10 million lawsuit against Master P and No Limit Records, asserting that the label "persuaded Mia X to break her contract." No Limit Records subsequently filed a countersuit against Joseph asking for $20 million in damages.

1995: TRU, No Limit Records and Good Girl Gone Bad
In 1995, Mia X was signed to Master P's label No Limit Records after he inquired at Peaches Records and Tapes (where she was working at the time) about promising local female rappers. She joined the roster as a solo artist and also became a member of Master P's group at the time, TRU, where she experienced national success. She was the first female rapper to be signed by No Limit Records. On November 21, 1995, Mia X released her first album titled Good Girl Gone Bad, which failed to chart on any of the Billboard charts.

1997–98: Unlady Like and Mama Drama
In 1997, she released her first single from her upcoming second album titled "The Party Don't Stop" featuring Master P and Foxy Brown. On June 24, 1997, Mia X released her second album, Unlady Like, which peaked at No. 21 on the Billboard 200 and No. 11 on the Top R&B/Hip-Hop Albums chart. The record was certified gold in October 1997.

On October 27, 1998, Mia X released her third album, Mama Drama, which peaked at No. 7 on the Billboard 200 and No. 3 on the Top R&B/Hip-Hop Albums charts.

1999–present
Beginning in 1999, Mia X went on hiatus from recording following the deaths of fourteen family members, including both her parents, in an eighteen-month span, in addition to the dissolution of the No Limit roster due to Master P pursuing non-musical interests. In the early 2000s, she worked in real estate and as a ghostwriter for other hip-hop artists.

Mia X appeared on C-Murder's 2008 release Screamin' 4 Vengeance, on tracks titled "Mihita" and "Posted on tha Block". On June 13, 2014, she released a new single titled "Mr. Right", featuring artist Ms. Tasha via her label, Mama Mia Muzic. On September 1, 2015, Mia X released a new single titled "No More" featuring Caren Green. She released a mixtape in 2010 titled Unladylike Forever, and claimed she was working on a new album titled Betty Rocka Locksmith, but it was never released.

Discography

Studio albums
 Good Girl Gone Bad (1995) 
 Unlady Like (1997)
 Mama Drama (1998)

Extended plays
 Da Payback (1993)
 ''Mommie Dearest (1995)

Filmography
Films

References

External links
Mia X on Myspace

 

1970 births
Living people
Actresses from New Orleans
American women rappers
American women hip hop singers
American rhythm and blues musicians
No Limit Records artists
Rappers from New Orleans
Southern hip hop musicians
Gangsta rappers
21st-century American rappers
21st-century American women musicians
African-American women rappers
African-American women singer-songwriters
21st-century African-American women
21st-century African-American musicians
20th-century African-American people
20th-century African-American women
Singer-songwriters from Louisiana
21st-century women rappers